Kelley Johnson Manso (born 19 December 1992) is a Puerto Rican footballer who plays for Swedish club Skövde KIK and the Puerto Rico women's national team.

Club career
She had played for the Northern Virginia Majestics.
A former F.C. Indiana player, Johnson signed for Mayagüez-based club Puerto Rico Sol in last July 2018.

International career
Springfield, Virginia-raised Johnson was eligible to play for the United States or Puerto Rico, choosing the latter.

Johnson capped for Puerto Rico during the 2016 CONCACAF Women's Olympic Qualifying Championship.

Personal life
Johnson's older sister Ashley also plays for the Puerto Rico women's national football team.

References 

1992 births
Living people
Women's association football defenders
Women's association football midfielders
Puerto Rican women's footballers
Puerto Rico women's international footballers
Puerto Rican people of African-American descent
Puerto Rican expatriate women's footballers
Puerto Rican expatriate sportspeople in Sweden
Expatriate women's footballers in Sweden
Soccer players from Virginia
People from Springfield, Virginia
American sportspeople of Puerto Rican descent
East Carolina Pirates women's soccer players
F.C. Indiana players